Buraphaphirom Palace was situated in Bangkok, Thailand, this palace was built to be the residence of Prince Bhanurangsi Savangwongse, the origin of the royal family surname Bhanubandhu.

The palace was built in the year 1875 according to the order of King Chulalongkorn (Rama V) with a colonial style by Italian architect Joachim Grassi. Its name means "Delightful East Palace", regarded as another palace that was very grand.

After World War II, it became an abandoned palace. It was rented as Bhanuthat girls' school. Later, the heir of the prince therefore decided to sell it to businessman Osot Kosin in the year 1951 with a price of nearly 13 million baht to build as a new shopping and entertainment districts. The demolition was completed in 1954 and was rebuilt as three movie theaters namely Kings, Queens, Grand (not counting the Sala Chalermkrung Royal Theatre, which was also nearby). Since then the original location of the Buraphaphirom Palace became Bangkok's most bustling commercial district in the 1950s to 1960s under the name of Wang Burapha, which is known as the center of teenagers, young people of that era.

The prosperity of Wang Burapha began to decline when Ratchaprasong Shopping Center and Siam Square replaced in 1965.

At present, the original location of Buraphaphirom Palace became the Mega Plaza.

See more
List of Thai royal residences

References

 Former royal residences in Bangkok
1954 disestablishments
Demolished buildings and structures in Bangkok